The Motorola i920/i930 is Motorola's first wave of iDEN Protocol-based smartphones.

Background
Both the i920 and the i930 were released for use with Sprint Nextel's iDEN Network, marketed as a phone that Sprint Nextel iDEN customers can take without having to resort to an alternate phone number outside the Continental US.  In the past, world travellers subscribing to Nextel iDEN Services generally have to carry an alternate phone (i.e. the V180) to roam around the world.  With the i920 or the i930, one phone, one phone number can be used at any part of the world  which has a GSM network.  The phone won't be made available to either Boost Mobile or Southern Linc networks, given that Boost Mobile is a prepaid service and Southern Linc is a regional carrier serving mainly Alabama and Georgia.

i920/i930 specifications
As of the February 16, 2006 update, the specifications are based from the Phonescoop and the Sprint Nextel intel unless otherwise footnoted:
Three-Mode GSM with iDEN 800 and Nextel Worldwide Service Support
Clamshell Form-Factor with extendable antenna and Easy-Flip Button
176x220 16-Bit Internal TFT Color Screen (65536 Colors) with 96x65 STN LCD 4096 External Color Screen
Windows Mobile 2003 Second Edition Build 4.21.1088 with the following:
22MB Smartphone-Reserved Memory
26MB In-Smartphone Memory for Storage 
32MB SDRAM
64MB EEPROM 
310K Pixel VGA (640x480) Camera with LED Flash and 10-Second Video Recording—only available with the i930
Multimedia and Text Messaging Service
WiDEN High-Speed Data Support
SD/MMC Card Compatibility (Does not support SDIO) 
Speakerphone
Pocket Internet Explorer with Pocket Outlook
MSN Messenger
Windows Media Player 10 Support
Active Sync
T9 Text Entry System
Java ME
MMS Support
GPS and Airplane (Disable RF) Mode
Length of 3.5", Width of 1.9", Depth of 1.2"
Weight of 5.9 Ounces with included battery
165 Minutes Talk Time (245 Minutes for 6:1 Networks), 65 hours Standby
880 mAh Lithium Ion Battery included

Pricing and release information
At the initial release of the Motorola i930, the phone was released for sale on October 6, 2005, but the demand and anticipation has been extremely high when the phone first came out that it was backordered due to limited stock.  Popularity and demand of the i930 eclipsed when potential buyers found out that stock was grievously scarce, followed by a steep and gradual decline in demand at the release of the i870.

In order to adhere to corporation-wide policies of camera absence in electronic devices, Motorola released a non-camera version of the i930 called the i920 sometime in February.  While the technology on both the i920 and the i930 are considered to be obsolete by some, the pricing map is as follows:

The 2-year agreement price is available to new Nextel subscribers, as well as all current Nextel subscribers, which is specifically outlined in the Nextel Upgrade Frequency Policy Pages.  Firm-related incentives, Equipment/Phone exemptions, and other perks may be given at the discretion of Sprint Nextel.  The following firms currently have Equipment/Phones exempt from the NUFP plus Two-Year Incentives:
 NUFP Clause for Western States Contracting Alliance Members

Nextel's Upgrade Frequency Policy (UFP) was enacted in February 2005 so that existing customers could not buy inexpensive phones for the low 2-year contract price (free in the case of the i205) and then resell them.

Known criticisms
The phone has been criticized for its lack of Bluetooth, long delay to release, the lack of Motorola's MotoTalk-branded Off-Network Walkie-Talkie and its use of Windows Mobile 2003 over Windows Mobile 5.0 as well as not being upgradeable to that version.  Many also ciritcize the i930 and i920 as having WiDEN support built-in, but inactive when shipped to the consumer.  Those who have unlocked the WiDEN capabilities upon first release were mortified to find Sprint shutting down the WiDEN service from the NEXTEL towers when rebanding began in the 800 MHz frequencies used by NEXTEL handsets.  Sprint's explanation was that they needed to regain the channels used by WiDEN to support cellular calls during the rebanding.  Those markets who have had their rebanding completed have yet to see WiDEN services restored to the towers in their areas.

Motorola has stated in their FAQ page that the i930 cannot use SDIO Cards nor can it be upgraded to Windows Mobile 2005 no matter the cause.

Application lockup controversy
Application-minded experts heavily criticised the Motorola i930 for the following reasons:
Application-Locking—The Motorola i930 could only install smartphone applications digitally signed and/or authorized by Sprint Nextel.  Other Applications which are "Windows Mobile-Neutral" are likely to fail.
Installation Issues—An application that is digitally approved by Sprint Nextel can also fail to install.
An online petition was started and some owners checked into the possibility of a class action lawsuit because the application locked phone would not perform as advertised.  This controversy became less important when some creative forum members came up with a program called NUNLOCK  to decertify and fix common issues with the i930.

NOTE: All criticisms and rumors pertaining to the Motorola i930 can be found at either the iDEN Custom, Dave's PDA, The Howard Forums, or the iDEN Insider websites, though criticisms are not yet final as of right now.''

Likely market
Being an "All-in-One" Nextel Phone with iDEN, WiDEN, and GSM in one, both the i920 and the i930 are targeted mainly to executives who require one single number to be used anywhere in the world where there is a GSM network, it also has the benefit of using Microsoft Outlook to synchronize schedules and meeting information.

See also
 Sprint Nextel
 Microsoft Windows Mobile
 iDEN Technology
 WiDEN Technology
 GSM Technology
 Motorola iDEN phone models

External links
 Motorola iDEN Page
 Sprint Nextel's Home Page
 Motorola i930 official page
 Motorola i920 official page
 Southern Linc's Home Page
 Motorola i930's Vital Statistics from Microsoft

Works cited
 FCC OET Approval Documents
 FCC OET Approval Grant
 Phonescoop CES 2005 intel of the i930

Windows Mobile Standard devices
I930
IDEN mobile phones